Douglas Bruce Cowie (born 2 December 1946) is a former cricket umpire from New Zealand. He officiated at first-class level for over two decades, before a ten-year spell at international level which saw him officiate in 22 Tests and 71 ODIs. He umpired in the 1999 World Cup in England.

See also
 List of Test cricket umpires
 List of One Day International cricket umpires

References

External links
 

1946 births
Living people
New Zealand Test cricket umpires
New Zealand One Day International cricket umpires
People from Kaitaia